Asiavaleh may refer to:
 Asiavaleh, Lorestan